Alejandro Gallinal or Cerro Colorado (old name, still in use) is a village in the Florida Department of southern-central Uruguay.

Geography

History
On 18 December 1952, the locality "Cerro Colorado" was given its new name by decree Ley N° 11.893. Its status was elevated to "Pueblo" (village) by decree Ley N° 15.708 on 28 January 1985.

Population
In 2011 Alejandro Gallinal had a population of 1,357.
 
Source: Instituto Nacional de Estadística de Uruguay

References

External links

INE map of Alejandro Gallinal

Populated places in the Florida Department